Höffner, Hoffner or Hoeffner may refer to:

 Joseph Höffner (1906–1987), a German cardinal of the Roman Catholic Church
 Höffner (furniture retailer) in Germany
 Carleton Hoffner, American figure skater
 Charles Hoffner (1896–1981), American professional golfer
 Harry A. Hoffner (1934–2015), American professor of Hittitology
 Hoffner Historic District, Cincinnati, Ohio, U.S.
 Helen Hoffner, singer, who released the album Wild about Nothing
 Lou (German singer) (Louise Hoffner, born 1963)

See also
Höfner, German manufacturer of musical instruments
Hefner (disambiguation)

German-language surnames